Isabella Crettenand-Moretti, née Moretti (born 26 August 1963), is a female Swiss ski mountaineer, marathon mountain biker, long-distance and mountain runner. She lives in Sion.

Her twin sister Cristina Favre-Moretti also competes in endurance sport events.

Selected results

Ski mountaineering 
 2004:
 1st, World Championship relay race (together with Catherine Mabillard and Cristina Favre-Moretti)
 1st, Trophée des Gastlosen, together with Cristina Favre-Moretti
 2nd, World Championship vertical race
 2nd, World Championship team race (together with Jeanine Bapst)
 3rd, World Championship single race
 3rd, World Championship combination ranking
 2005:
 1st, European Championship team race (together with Cristina Crettenand-Moretti)
 1st, European Championship relay race (together with Cristina Favre-Moretti and Gabrielle Magnenat)
 1st, Pierra Menta (together with Cristina Favre-Moretti)
 2nd, European Championship combination ranking
 3rd, European Championship single race
 4th, European Championship vertical race

Patrouille des Glaciers 

 2004: 1st and course record, together with Catherine Mabillard and Cristina Favre-Moretti
 2008: 3rd, together with Catherine Mabillard and Cristina Favre-Moretti

Running 
 2010: 1st, Iron-Terrific, Crans-Montana

Mountain biking

Grand Raid Cristalp 
 1999: 1st, 131 km
 2003: 2nd, 131 km

References 

1963 births
Living people
Swiss female ski mountaineers
World ski mountaineering champions
Swiss female long-distance runners
Marathon mountain bikers
Swiss female mountain runners